Mosonngoa is a 2014 Mosotho action–drama short film directed by Lemohang Jeremiah Mosese and produced by Hannah Stockmann. The film stars Siphiwe Nzima-Ntskhe in the titular lead role whereas Masele Tokane, Chaka Phehlamarole Khalechene and Retselisitsoe Sekake made supportive roles.

The film received critical reviews from critics and screened at several international film festivals.

Cast
 Siphiwe Nzima-Ntskhe as Mosonngoa
 Masele Tokane as Young Mosonngoa
 Chaka Phehlamarole Khalechene as Rapule
 Retselisitsoe Sekake as Phefo
 Matoae Toae

International screenings
 Cannes Film Festival, France for Short Film Corner – May 2014	
 Durban International Film Festival, South Africa – 25 July 2014	
 Richmond International Film Festival, USA – 26 February 2015	
 Carthage Film Festival, Tunisia – 25 November 2015

References

External links
 

2014 films
Lesotho short films
2014 short films
Lesotho drama films